JP Smith may refer to:

 JP Smith (politician), city councillor from Cape Town, South Africa
 JP Smith (rugby union), South African and Australian rugby union player
 John-Patrick Smith, Australian professional tennis player
 Juan-Philip Smith, South African rugby union player

See also

 J. Smith (disambiguation)